The 1998 Salem Open was a men's tennis tournament played on Hard courts in Hong Kong that was part of the International Series of the 1998 ATP Tour. It was the 23rd edition of the tournament and was held from 6–12 April 1998.

Seeds
Champion seeds are indicated in bold text while text in italics indicates the round in which those seeds were eliminated.

Draw

Finals

References

Doubles
Hong Kong Open (tennis)